Foxear Creek is a stream in the municipality of Greenstone, Thunder Bay District in northwestern Ontario, Canada. It is in the Great Lakes Basin and is a left tributary of the Namewaminikan River. The river lies in the geographic townships of Sandra, Irwin and Walters.

Course
The river begins at Foxear Lake. It travels west through a series of lakes, flows under Ontario Highway 801, and arrives at Bearskin Lake. It continues west through Windigokan Lake before reaching its mouth at the Namewaminikan River. The Namewaminikan River flows via Lake Nipigon and the Nipigon River to Lake Superior.

References

Sources

Rivers of Thunder Bay District